Two Gun Troubador is a 1939 American Western film directed by Raymond K. Johnson and written by Richard L. Bare and Phil Dunham. The film stars Fred Scott, Claire Rochelle, John Merton, Harry Harvey Sr., Carl Mathews and William Woods. The film was released on March 5, 1939, by Spectrum Pictures.

Plot

Cast          
Fred Scott as Fred Dean Jr.
Claire Rochelle as Helen Bradfield
John Merton as Bill Barton
Harry Harvey Sr. as Elmer Potts
Carl Mathews as Kirk Dean
William Woods as Sheriff Holbrook
Billy Lenhart as Fred Dean 
James 'Buddy' Kelly as Tom Bradfield 
Gene Howard as Pedro Yorba
Harry Harvey Jr. as Bill Barton
John Ward as Fred Dean Sr.

References

External links
 

1939 films
American Western (genre) films
1939 Western (genre) films
Films directed by Raymond K. Johnson
American black-and-white films
1930s English-language films
1930s American films